ROSA is a medical robotic technology, designed to minimize invasiveness of surgeries of the central nervous system. ROSA robots assist health professionals during surgical procedures.

The ROSA technology, developed by the French company Zimmer Biomet Robotics, is used in 120 hospitals across Europe, North America, Asia and the Middle East.

The device allows frameless stereotactic procedures increasing accuracy  and reducing operative time. It is especially effective for SEEG, DBS, endoscopic procedures, brain tumor resection and pediatric surgery.

The ROSA device combines software for neurosurgical planning and navigation, with a robotic arm of high technology.

The system was designed by Zimmer Biomet Robotics (Montpellier, France) and is currently used in Europe, North America, Asia and Australia.

References

Computer assisted surgery|Medical robots|Surgical robots|Medical robotics